The Incredible Machine (TIM) is a series of video games in which players create a series of Rube Goldberg devices. They were originally designed and coded by Kevin Ryan and produced by Jeff Tunnell, the now-defunct Jeff Tunnell Productions, and published by Dynamix; the 1993 through 1995 versions had the same development team, but the later 2000–2001 games have different designers. All versions were published by Sierra Entertainment. The entire series and intellectual property were acquired by Jeff Tunnell-founded PushButton Labs in October 2009. Pushbutton Labs was later acquired by Playdom, itself a division of Disney Interactive, so as of now the rights are held by The Walt Disney Company.

A new game by Jeff Tunnell, called Contraption Maker, is the spiritual successor to the Incredible Machine series. It was produced by Spotkin Games, a company founded by Jeff Tunnell, and features the same developers of the original Incredible Machine. The game was released through Steam for Windows and OS X on July 7, 2014.

Gameplay
The general goal of the games is to create a series of Rube Goldberg devices: arrange a given collection of objects in a needlessly complex fashion so as to perform some simple task (such as "put the ball into a box" or "start a mixer and turn on a fan"). Available objects range from simple ropes and pulleys to electrical generators, bowling balls, and even cats and mice to humans, most of which have specific interactions with or reactions to other objects. For example, mice will run towards nearby cheese. The levels usually have some fixed objects that cannot be moved by the player, and so the only way to solve the puzzle is to carefully arrange the given objects around the fixed items. There is also a "freeform" option that allows the user to "play" with all the objects with no set goal or to also build their own puzzles with goals for other players to attempt to solve.

Notably, the games simulate not only the physical interactions between objects but also ambient effects like varying air pressure and gravity. The engine does not use a random number generator in its physics simulation, ensuring that the results for any given machine are reproducible.

Titles
The series includes four core titles and a "Toon" spin-off, with multiple iterations published of the earliest titles:
The Incredible Machine (1993, DOS/3DO)
The Even More Incredible Machine (1993, DOS/Microsoft Windows, Macintosh)
The Incredible Machine (2011, Apple iPad)
Sid & Al's Incredible Toons (1993, DOS)
The Incredible Toon Machine (1994, Microsoft Windows, Macintosh)
Arthur to Astaroth no Nazomakaimura: Incredible Toons (1996, PlayStation/Sega Saturn)
The Incredible Machine 2 (1994, DOS/Microsoft Windows, Macintosh)
The Incredible Machine Version 3.0 (1995, Microsoft Windows/Macintosh)
Return of the Incredible Machine: Contraptions (2000, Microsoft Windows/Macintosh)
The Incredible Machine: Even More Contraptions (2001, Microsoft Windows/Macintosh/Palm OS)

A compilation called The Incredible Machine Mega Pack was released in 2009 on GOG.com for Microsoft Windows. It included The Even More Incredible Machine, The Incredible Machine Version 3.0, Return of the Incredible Machine: Contraptions, and The Incredible Machine: Even More Contraptions.

The Incredible Machine and Even More Incredible Machine

The Incredible Machine, the first game in the series, was originally going to be developed by Electronic Arts for the Commodore 64 in 1984, but Dynamix worked on Arcticfox for the Amiga instead and work did not start on The Incredible Machine until early 1993. The Even More Incredible Machine is an extended version with 160 levels, about twice the original, and has more parts.

The Incredible Machine 2 and 3.0

The Incredible Machine 2 introduced new levels, an extended assortment of parts, a new interface, significantly improved graphics, sounds, and music, and two player hotseat play. It improved on the "freeform" mode, allowing players to create completely playable puzzles by defining not only the participating parts, but also the set of circumstances under which the puzzle will be considered "solved". In terms of gameplay, this version provided the biggest addition to the series, and subsequent updates were basically only ports of the game to newer operating systems with updated graphics/sounds and sometimes new puzzles, but no new parts.

The Incredible Machine Version 3.0 (1995), on some releases titled Professor Tim's Incredible Machines, contains the same levels as The Incredible Machine 2, but with an improved interface and extra features like CD music tracks.

Return of the Incredible Machine: Contraptions and Even More Contraptions

Return of the Incredible Machine: Contraptions was released in 2000. As a full 32-bit Windows 95 game, it has new 800x600 resolution graphics. Although it has a few new levels, the majority of them are levels from The Incredible Machine 2.

Even More Contraptions (2001) started a service allowing players to share their homemade puzzles using a service called "WonSwap". Even More Contraptions also came with a Palm Pilot version of the game that contained its own unique set of parts and puzzles suited for a small screen.

The Incredible Machine Mega Pack
Released on GOG.com, The Incredible Machine Mega Pack includes Even More Incredible Machine, The Incredible Machine 3 (contains all levels from The Incredible Machine 2), Contraptions, and Even More Contraptions.

Reception

Neil Harris reported in Computer Gaming World in 1994 that showing The Incredible Machine to an engineer friend caused "a chain reaction that brought productive work to a halt at a major naval yard".

IGN described Return of the Incredible Machine: Contraptions as "a vintage blend of educational and entertainment software at their finest".

The developers of the series have been criticized by fans for recycling content, specifically all the games after The Incredible Machine 2, rather than creating new additions to the games.

By 2000, the series had sold over one million copies.

Legacy
The Incredible Machine: Even More Contraptions was included in the 2005 edition of Hoyle Puzzle Games as a bonus game.

A mobile phone version was developed by Mobile Interactions Group and published by Vivendi Games Mobile in 2006.

A new game was announced for a download release on Xbox Live Arcade, but was later canceled.

The Incredible Machine Mega Pack (which includes Even More Incredible Machine, The Incredible Machine 3, Return of the Incredible Machine: Contraptions, and The Incredible Machine: Even More Contraptions) was published by Playdom and released on GOG.com on October 1, 2009.

Sid & Al's Incredible Toons and The Incredible Toon Machine are not an official part of the series, but are essentially a cartoon version of the same concept, created by Chris Cole.

iOS
The Incredible Machine for iOS is the first version in the series to be developed and released by Disney for the AppStore. This revamped version contains new art, sounds, and levels, as well as a redesigned user interface. Disney released The Incredible Machine on June 8, 2011 at E3 in Los Angeles, CA. The app has been retired from the app store as a decision made by Disney.

Contraption Maker
In 2013, Tunnell began the work on a new game, called Contraption Maker, which is billed as a "spiritual successor" to the Incredible Machine series. Kevin Ryan and Brian Hahn, the other two developers on the original game, worked on Contraption Maker as well, along with other developers at Spotkin, a video game development company started by Tunnell.

Contraption Maker features improved "HD" graphics, and has a robust physics engine. The game features over 200 official puzzles and over 100 different parts. It also has Steam Workshop support, so users can create and share their own puzzles.

The game was first released on Steam through its Early Access program on August 28, 2013. Throughout its time in the program, Contraption Maker had 6 Alpha releases, adding features such as multiplayer and copy-and-paste, new parts, and new puzzles, followed by a Beta release in May 2014. The final (1.0) release was made in July the same year, and Contraption Maker left the Steam Early Access program.

References

External links

Interactive Achievement Award winners
IOS games
Puzzle video games by series
Video game franchises
Video game franchises introduced in 1993
Sierra Entertainment games
D.I.C.E. Award for Family Game of the Year winners
Video games developed in the United States